Plaza Servicios Aéreos was a passenger and domestic cargo airline based in Zaragoza, Aragon, Spain.

History 
The airline was established in 2006 and was wholly owned by Swiftair. It ceased operations in 2008.

Destinations 
Plaza Servicios Aéreos operated the following services from Zaragoza until October 2008:

Spain
Málaga
Santiago de Compostela

Fleet
The Plaza Servicios Aéreos fleet included the following aircraft (as of 21 September 2008):

1 ATR 42-300 (operated by Top Fly)
2 Boeing 727-200 (operated by Swiftair)

References

External links 

Plaza Servicios Aéreos

Airlines established in 2006
Airlines disestablished in 2008
Defunct airlines of Spain
Transport in Aragon
2006 establishments in Spain
2008 disestablishments in Spain